Oghenemaro Miles "Maro"  Itoje (born 28 October 1994) is an English professional rugby union player, who plays as a lock or as a blindside flanker for Gallagher Premiership club Saracens and the England national team. He signed his first professional contract with Saracens in 2012, and made his first appearance the following year. He received his first-call up to the England team in 2016 ahead of the annual Six Nations Championship, and became a firm favourite to both Saracens and England fans.

So far in his rugby career, he has won four English Premiership titles with Saracens, three European Rugby Champions Cup titles, and three Six Nations Championship titles.

Itoje has been selected for two British & Irish Lions tours and in the second tour was voted the Lions Player of the series by his peers.

Early life 
Maro Itoje was born in Camden, North London to Nigerian parents. He attended Salcombe Preparatory School in Southgate, North London at a primary level, before moving to board at St George's School in Harpenden, Hertfordshire. At St George's Itoje was first introduced to rugby at the age of eleven. He later won a scholarship to Harrow School, a private school in London.

As a schoolboy, Itoje played several sports including basketball, football, rugby and athletics, representing England at U17 level in shot put. He studied for a politics degree at the School of Oriental and African Studies in Bloomsbury, London at the same time as starting his rugby career.

Club career 
His senior debut for Saracens came in the 2013–14 season, aged 19, when he played against Cardiff Blues in the Anglo-Welsh Cup. He made his Aviva Premiership debut against Leicester Tigers later in the same season. Prior to this he had played for Harpenden RFC at junior level (2005–11), then in the first team at Old Albanian RFC, usually as a lock (second row forward). During his time at Saracens he has won four Premiership titles in 2015, 2016, 2018 and 2019, with Itoje featuring in all four finals. He also helped Saracens win the European Champions Cup in 2016, 2017 and 2019.

In the same season Itoje was named European Player of the Year.

International career 
Itoje represented England at U18 and captained the England U20 team in the 2013–14 season. He scored a try in every 2014 Six Nations Under 20s Championship game and was England's Man of the Tournament.

Also in 2014 Itoje with England won the 2014 IRB Junior World Championship co-captaining the side throughout the tournament.

Itoje was called up to the England Saxons squad on 21 January 2015 and made his debut against Ireland Wolfhounds on 30 January 2015.

Itoje was selected for the England 2015 Rugby World Cup training squad and received his first call-up to the senior England squad from new coach Eddie Jones on 13 January 2016 for the 2016 Six Nations Championship. He went on to make his first-team debut against Italy and was named Man of the Match for his performance in the win against Wales on 12 March 2016. England later went on to win the Grand Slam. Itoje also played a starring role in the summer series win against Australia, starting all three Tests.

Itoje was again instrumental in England's defence of the Six Nations title in 2017, this time starting all five games at blindside flanker rather than his more usual second row.

Itoje was selected for the British & Irish Lions for their tour of New Zealand, being the youngest player named in the 41-man squad, aged 22. He was one of the standout players on the tour, scoring one try against the Maori All Blacks and appearing in all three tests against the All Blacks. The Lions went on to draw the three-game series in the final test.

He was again selected for the 2021 British & Irish Lions tour to South Africa, which the tourists went on to lose in the closely fought 3rd game decider. He was again a standout player and was subsequently voted the Lions Player of the series by his peers.

International tries
As of 17 November 2021

Style of play 
Itoje has been described by many as a hard-working player and also as a team leader, with many writers claiming him to be a "star player". He is mobile and agile for a lock forward, with the capacity to get into wide channels, make breaks through his speed, and claim turnovers in the ruck. He is also outstanding in the air, whether in the lineout or open play. Many believe he has no real weaknesses as a rugby player, though some have argued he does give away too many penalties in breakdowns.

Career honours 
Saracens
 English Premiership champions (4): 2014–15, 2015–16, 2017–18, 2018-19
 RFU Championship champions: 2020–21 
 European Rugby Champions Cup champions (3): 2015–16, 2016–17, 2018-19
LV Cup champions: 2014-15

England U20s

 2014 IRB Junior World Championship champions

England

 2016 Six Nations Championship champions (3): 2016, 2017, 2020
 Grand Slam Champions: 2016
Triple Crown Winners (2):2016, 2020
 Autumn Nations Cup champions: 2020
Individual

 European Player of the Year: 2016
 World Rugby Player of the Year nominee: 2016,2017,2021

Personal life
Itoje has expressed interests in politics and art.

References

External links
 
 Maro Itoje at the Saracens website.

1994 births
Living people
Alumni of SOAS University of London
Black British sportspeople
British & Irish Lions rugby union players from England
England international rugby union players
English people of Nigerian descent
English rugby union players
People educated at Harrow School
Rugby union flankers
Rugby union locks
Rugby union players from London Borough of Camden
Saracens F.C. players